Barry Nicholson (born 24 August 1978) is a Scottish former professional footballer, who played as a midfielder. He is currently in charge of Fleetwood Town's development squad and also served as caretaker manager of the first team squad.

He started his professional career with Rangers and went on to play over 100 games for each of Dunfermline Athletic, Aberdeen and Preston North End. He then played for Fleetwood Town before finishing his career at Kilmarnock. Nicholson earned three full caps for Scotland, all won during his time with Dunfermline.

Club career

Early years
Born in Dumfries, Nicholson watched matches of hometown club Queen of the South with his father. From playing youth football in Dumfries, he then joined Rangers. Limited appearances in Rangers' first team over several years saw him move on in 2000. Some records show that he scored once for Rangers in a UEFA Champions League qualifier against FC Haka in 1999, but Nicholson has stated that the goal should be credited to Jonatan Johansson.

Dunfermline Athletic
Nicholson joined Dunfermline Athletic under the helm of Jimmy Calderwood and was a first team regular in what was the Pars' most successful period since the George Farm era. 2002–03 saw them finish 5th, and the following season they finished fourth as well as reaching the 2004 Scottish Cup Final, qualifying for a UEFA competition for the first time since 1970.

Aberdeen
Nicholson's performances at East End Park saw him signed by Aberdeen for a fee of £250,000 in July 2005 and re-joined former boss Calderwood who had since moved to Pittodrie. The move paid dividends as his strong performances towards the end of the 2006–07 season saw him score vital goals. The most notable of these was the last minute equaliser against Hearts which all but clinched third place for Aberdeen, with only two matches of the season left at that stage.

The Dons qualified from their group in the 2007–08 UEFA Cup after a 4–0 win against F.C. Copenhagen. They were twice ahead in the next round at home against Bayern Munich before drawing 2–2. The Bavarians won the return leg comfortably.

In October 2007, Nicholson scored the first hat-trick of his career, by scoring three goals against Inverness Caledonian Thistle in the quarterfinals of the League Cup, with two of the goals being penalties.

Nicholson scored the second goal for Aberdeen against hometown club Queen of the South in the 2007–08 Scottish Cup semifinals. Queens won the 7-goal thriller 4–3 to make it to the final for the first time in their history. He later magnanimously said, "I think that they were the better team and deserved to go through."

Preston North End
On 30 June 2008, Nicholson signed a two-year contract with an option of a third year on a free transfer for Preston North End, subject to passing a medical.

Nicholson scored his first goal for Preston in a 2–0 preseason friendly away to Chorley.
On 22 August 2009, he sustained a suspected broken leg in the Championship game versus Peterborough United. Nicholson returned from injury for the final game of the 2009-10 season only to limp off the field within 15 minutes suffering from an injury to the same leg. Nicholson returned to the side in January 2011 playing regularly for the remainder of the season. He was released by Preston at the end of the 2011-12 season.

Later career
Nicholson signed for Fleetwood Town for the 2012–13 season. He then moved to Kilmarnock in August 2013 on a short-term contract. On 24 August 2014, he scored his first goal for the club in a 2–1 defeat against Hibernian. In January 2014, Nicholson's contract was extended until the end of the season.

At the end of the 2013–14 season, Nicholson retired from playing and became the development manager at Fleetwood Town.

International career
Nicholson won three caps for Scotland, the first being in the friendly draw with Poland in April 2001; the last was in the friendly defeat to Sweden in November 2004.

Honours
Dunfermline Athletic – 2004 Scottish Cup Finalist

References

External links

 
 Profile at AFCheritage

1978 births
Living people
People educated at Dumfries Academy
Footballers from Dumfries
Scottish footballers
Association football midfielders
Rangers F.C. players
Dunfermline Athletic F.C. players
Aberdeen F.C. players
Preston North End F.C. players
Fleetwood Town F.C. players
Kilmarnock F.C. players
Scotland B international footballers
Scotland international footballers
Scotland under-21 international footballers
Scottish Premier League players
English Football League players
Scottish Professional Football League players
Fleetwood Town F.C. non-playing staff